The 2012 Big East men's soccer tournament was the 17th edition of the tournament, and the last to be organized by the original Big East Conference. The event decided the Big East Conference champion and guaranteed representative into the 2012 NCAA Division I Men's Soccer Championship. Held from October 31–November 11, it was the first men's college soccer conference tournament to begin in the 2012 season. The semifinal and championship rounds were held for the third-consecutive year at Red Bull Arena, in Harrison, New Jersey.

St. John's were the defending champions, having defeated Connecticut 1–0 in the 2011 championship.

By the end of the 2012–13 school year, the Big East split into two leagues along football lines. The seven schools that did not sponsor FBS football left to form a new Big East Conference, while the FBS schools that did not leave for other conferences stayed in the original Big East structure under the new name of American Athletic Conference.

Qualification

Bracket

Schedule 

Note: Home team is listed on the left, away team is listed on the right.

First round

Quarterfinals

Semifinals

Big East Championship

Statistical leaders 

Note: Statistics only for post-season games.

Top scorers

Most assists

See also 
 Big East Conference
 2012 Big East Conference men's soccer season
 2012 NCAA Division I men's soccer season
 2012 NCAA Division I Men's Soccer Championship

References 

Big East Men's Soccer Tournament
Big East Conference Men's Soccer Tournament